Md. Abdul Majid Khan is a Bangladesh Awami League politician and the incumbent Member of Parliament from Habiganj-2.

Early life
Khan was born on 31 December 1954. He completed his undergraduate in communications and also has a law degree.

Career
Khan was elected to Parliament on 5 January 2014 from Habiganj-2 as a Bangladesh Awami League candidate.

References

Awami League politicians
Living people
1954 births
9th Jatiya Sangsad members
10th Jatiya Sangsad members
11th Jatiya Sangsad members